Valentine is a city in Cherry County, Nebraska, United States. The population was 2,737 at the 2010 census. It is the county seat of Cherry County.

History
Valentine was founded in 1882. The Valentine post office was established on December 4, 1882. The Sioux City and Pacific Railroad was extended to that point and train service began on April 1, 1883. It was named for Edward K. Valentine, a Nebraska representative.

As late as 1967, Valentine was split between two time zones.  As described in one news report, "The mountain and central time zones meet at the center of Main Street, so an hour separates the two curb lines."  According to the report, when clocks were required to be set back one hour for daylight saving time, Valentine's post office (which was in the central zone) split the difference and turned back its clock by only half an hour.

Valentine participates in an annual re-mailing program where thousands of pieces of mail flow into the local United States Post Office so that they can be re-mailed with a special Valentine's Day postmark and verse.

In 2007, National Geographic Adventure magazine included Valentine in its list of the best 100 adventure towns and cities.

In the Lakota language, Valentine is known as Oínažiŋ or Mnináȟaȟa Otȟúŋwahe, meaning "station stopping place" or "water and waterfall city".

Geography
Valentine is located at  (42.873686, −100.550308).

Valentine is immediately north of the Niobrara River, on the northern edge of the Sandhills physiographic region. Snake River Falls, the largest waterfall in Nebraska, is located on the Snake River between the reservoir (a few miles downstream) and Valentine.

Just south of Valentine, a pair of bridges span the Niobrara River. The modern bridge carries traffic north and south along U.S. Route 83. Just to the west, an arched cantilever truss bridge named the Bryan Bridge is also open to through traffic. Designed by Josef Sorkin and built in 1932, the Bryan Bridge is made of steel and is listed on the National Register of Historic Places. A large red neon heart (a star during the Christmas season) is found on the pine-covered Minnechaduza Creek canyon wall at the north end of Main Street.

Climate
With a humid continental climate (Köppen Dwa), Valentine experiences extremes of heat and cold annually; it is part of USDA Hardiness zone 4b. The average window for freezing temperatures is September 25 thru May 11, allowing a growing season of 136 days.

Demographics

2010 census
As of the census of 2010, there were 2,737 people, 1,259 households, and 719 families living in the city. The racial makeup of the city was 86.3% White, 0.1% African American, 9.1% Native American, 0.5% Asian, 0.7% from other races, and 3.3% from two or more races. Hispanic or Latino of any race were 1.6% of the population.

There were 1,259 households, of which 24.5% had children under the age of 18 living with them, 43.6% were married couples living together, 10.0% had a female householder with no husband present, 3.5% had a male householder with no wife present, and 42.9% were non-families. 38.6% of all households were made up of individuals, and 18.6% had someone living alone who was 65 years of age or older. The average household size was 2.13 and the average family size was 2.78.

The median age in the city was 46 years. 21.3% of residents were under the age of 18; 6.3% were between the ages of 18 and 24; 21.2% were from 25 to 44; 27.2% were from 45 to 64; and 24% were 65 years of age or older. The gender makeup of the city was 47.2% male and 52.8% female.

2000 census
As of the census of 2000, there were 2,820 people, 1,209 households, and 733 families living in the city. The population density was 1,401.1 people per square mile (541.7/km). There were 1,373 housing units at an average density of 682.2 per square mile (263.7/km). The racial makeup of the city was 92.20% White, 0.04% African American, 5.78% Native American, 0.57% Asian, 0.21% from other races, and 1.21% from two or more races. Hispanic or Latino of any race were 0.89% of the population.

There were 1,209 households, out of which 28.6% had children under the age of 18 living with them, 47.8% were married couples living together, 9.9% had a female householder with no husband present, and 39.3% were non-families. 36.1% of all households were made up of individuals, and 17.8% had someone living alone who was 65 years of age or older. The average household size was 2.27 and the average family size was 2.95.

In the city, the population was spread out, with 26.0% under the age of 18, 6.7% from 18 to 24, 24.0% from 25 to 44, 21.8% from 45 to 64, and 21.6% who were 65 years of age or older. The median age was 40 years. For every 100 females, there were 87.1 males. For every 100 females age 18 and over, there were 80.8 males.

The median income for a household in the city was $47,639, and the median income for a family was $52,632. Males had a median income of $38,188 versus $24,636 for females. The per capita income for the city was $22,715. About 1.6% of families and 6.4% of the population were below the poverty line, including 0% of those under age 18 and 16.0% of those age 65 or over.

Education
Valentine is in Valentine Community Schools.

Valentine City Schools was the school district until it merged into Valentine Community Schools in 2006.

Schools include:
 Valentine Elementary School
 Valentine Middle School
 Valentine High School

Private schools:
 Grace Lutheran School
 Zion Lutheran School

Notable people
 Lyman Lloyd Bryson, CBS Radio broadcaster and American educator. Bryson moderated CBS Radio's The American School of the Air during the 1940s.
 Edward Day Cohota was a Chinese born and an ethnic Chinese veteran who fought in American Civil War and later served thirty years in the army.
 James Dahlman,  Omaha mayor from 1906 to 1930.
 Clayton Danks, model of the Wyoming state symbol of the cowboy on a bucking horse, homesteaded near Valentine.
 Patrick Deuel, formerly one of the world's heaviest people.
 Rebecca Donaldson, fictional character on Full House, states that her hometown was Valentine.
 Deb Fischer, U.S. Senator, operates a ranch near Valentine.

Culture
In 2011/2012, an independent feature film, The Aviation Cocktail, had its principal photography in Valentine.

Notes

References
27. Read dead redemption 2

External links
 City of Valentine
 Valentine Community Schools

Cities in Cherry County, Nebraska
Cities in Nebraska
County seats in Nebraska
Populated places established in 1883
1883 establishments in Nebraska